Paul Cienniwa is an American harpsichordist, organist, choral conductor, and arts administrator. He is the Executive Director of the Binghamton Philharmonic. Previously, he was a Music Director at First Church in Boston and Chorus Master at the New Bedford Symphony Orchestra. He was on the faculties of the Music School at the Rhode Island Philharmonic Orchestra, Lynn University Conservatory of Music, UMass Dartmouth, and Framingham State University. He has recorded for Albany Records and Whaling City Sound. He has collaborated with uilleann piper Jerry O'Sullivan, recorder player Aldo Abreu, baroque violinist Dorian Komanoff Bandy, and violinist Rachel Barton Pine.

Life 
Cienniwa was born in Niles, Illinois in 1972. He completed his undergraduate at DePaul University in 1994. He then attended the Yale School of Music, where he earned a M.M. in 1997, a M.M.A. in 1998, and a D.M.A. in 2003. His principal teachers were harpsichordists Roger Goodman and Richard Rephann and organist Jerome Butera.

Discography 
 Telemann Sonatas for Violin and Harpsichord: Frankfurt, 1715 (Whaling City Sound, 2018)
 Allison: Volume One (2015)
 Harpsichord Music for a Thin Place (Whaling City Sound, 2012)
 Larry Bell: In a Garden of Dreamers (Albany, 2012)
 O'Sullivan Meets O'Farrell (2010)
 Bach: Sonatas for Viola da Gamba (Whaling City Sound, 2009)

Publications 
 By Heart: The Art of Memorizing Music (2014)

References

External links 
 artist's website
 St. Paul's Episcopal Church website
 First Church in Boston website
 UMass Dartmouth faculty page

American classical organists
American male organists
American harpsichordists
Yale School of Music alumni
DePaul University alumni
People from Niles, Illinois
Living people
Year of birth missing (living people)
21st-century organists
21st-century American male musicians
21st-century American keyboardists
Male classical organists